Colonial elections were held in South Australia from 8 April to 27 April 1881. All 46 seats in the South Australian House of Assembly were up for election, along with six of the 18 seats in the South Australian Legislative Council.

The Boucaut government which had taken the parliament into the 1878 election lasted only four months before it was defeated by William Morgan, who brought the first real stability to government. Morgan took the parliament through a full term, and into the 1881 election.

House of Assembly
Since the inaugural 1857 election, no parties or solid groupings had been formed, which resulted in frequent changes of the Premier. If for any reason the incumbent Premier of South Australia lost sufficient support through a successful motion of no confidence at any time on the floor of the house, he would tender his resignation to the Governor of South Australia, which would result in another member deemed to have the support of the House of Assembly being sworn in by the Governor as the next Premier.

Informal groupings began and increased government stability occurred from the 1887 election. The United Labor Party would be formed in 1891, while the National Defence League would be formed later in the same year.

Legislative Council
The franchise for the South Australian Legislative Council was more limited, requiring voters to meet a minimum value of land owned.

Six Members were elected in April 1881. They were:
William Christie Buik
James Rankine
John Pickering
Sir Henry Ayers
Robert Alfred Tarlton
John Brodie Spence
Ayers and Tarlton had been members whose terms had expired just before the election and they were re-elected.

See also
Premier of South Australia

Notes

References
History of South Australian elections 1857-2006, volume 1: ECSA
Statistical Record of the Legislature 1836-2007: SA Parliament

Elections in South Australia
1881 elections in Australia
1880s in South Australia
April 1881 events